El Paraíso is Spanish for "The Paradise." The name may refer to:

Places
El Paraíso, Caracas, a parish of Libertador Bolivarian Municipality, Caracas, Venezuela
El Paraíso, Chalatenango, El Salvador
El Paraíso, Copán, Honduras
El Paraíso Department, Honduras
El Paraíso, El Paraíso, Honduras
El Paraíso, a community of Omoa, Honduras
El Paraíso, Peru
 El Paraíso, Romita, Guanajuato, Mexico
 El Paraíso Verde, Caazapá Department, Paraguay

Other uses
El Paraíso Airport, an airport near El Paraíso, Beni, Bolivia
El Paraiso Open, a 1974 golf tournament at El Paraiso Golf Club in Marbella, Spain

See also 
 Paraíso (disambiguation)